The phonology of Catalan, a Romance language, has a certain degree of dialectal variation. Although there are two standard varieties, one based on Central Eastern dialect and another one based on South-Western or Valencian dialect, this article deals with features of all or most dialects, as well as regional pronunciation differences. Various studies have focused on different Catalan varieties; for example, Wheeler and Mascaró analyze Central Eastern varieties, the former focusing on the educated speech of Barcelona and the latter focusing more on the vernacular of Barcelona, and Recasens does a careful phonetic study of Central Eastern Catalan. 

Catalan is characterized by final-obstruent devoicing, lenition, and voicing assimilation; a set of 7 or 8 phonemic vowels, vowel assimilations (including vowel harmony), many phonetic diphthongs, and vowel reduction, whose precise details differ between dialects. Several dialects have a dark l, and all dialects have palatal l and n.

Consonants 
{| class="wikitable" style="text-align: center;"
|+ Consonants of Catalan
! colspan="2" |
! Labial
! Dental/Alveolar
! Palatal
! Velar
! Uvular
|-
! colspan="2" | Nasal
| 
| 
| 
|
|
|-
! rowspan="2" | Plosive
! voiceless
| 
| 
| colspan="2" | 
|
|-
! voiced
| 
| 
| colspan="2" | 
|
|-
! rowspan="2" | Affricate
! voiceless
|
| 
| 
|
|
|-
! voiced
|
| 
| 
|
|
|-
! rowspan="2" | Fricative
! voiceless
| 
| 
| 
|
|
|-
! voiced
|
| 
| 
|
|rowspan="2" |
|-
! rowspan="2" | Approximant
! central
|
|
| 
| 
|-
! lateral
|
| 
| 
|
|
|-
! colspan="2" | Trill
|
| 
|
|
|
|-
! colspan="2" | Tap
|
| 
|
|
|
|} 

Phonetic notes:
 ,  are laminal denti-alveolar , . After , they are laminal alveolar , .
 ,  are velar but fronted to pre-velar position before front vowels.
 ,  are apical alveolar , . They may be somewhat fronted, so that the stop component is laminal denti-alveolar, while the fricative component is apical post-dental.
 ,  are laminal "front alveolo-palatal" , .
Otherwise, sources, like Carbonell & Llisterri generally describe them as "postalveolar".

Obstruents 

Stops 
Voiced stops become lenited to fricatives or approximants in syllable onsets, after continuants:  → ,  → ,  → . 

Exceptions include  after lateral consonants and  after , e.g.   (E) /  (W) ('oeil-de-boeuf'),   (E) /  (W) ('excellent ballpoint').
Additionally,  remains unlenited in non-betacist dialects.
In the coda position, these sounds are always realized as stops; except in many Valencian dialects, where they are lenited. 

In Catalan (not in Valencian),  and  may be geminated in certain environments (e.g.   'village',   'rule').

Affricates 
The phonemic status of affricates is dubious; after other consonants, affricates are in free variation with fricatives, e.g.   (E) /  (W) ('hair parting') and may be analyzed as either single phonemes or clusters of a stop and a fricative.
  only occurs intervocalically:   (E) /  (W) ('toxic substances').
 Instances of  arise mostly from compounding; the few lexical instances arise from historical compounding. As such,  does not occur word-initially; other than some rare words of foreign origin (e.g. 'tsar',  'tsuga'), but it may occur word-finally and quite often in cases of heteromorphemic (i.e. across a morpheme boundary) plural endings:   ('everybody').
In most of Valencian and southern Catalonia, most occurrences of  correspond to the voiced fricative  in Standard Eastern Catalan:   ('ice').
 In Standard Eastern Catalan, word-initial  is found only in a few words of foreign origin (e.g.  'Czech',  'Tchaikovsky') while being found freely intervocalically (e.g.  'arrow') and word-finally:   (E) /  (W) ('office').
 Standard Eastern Catalan also only allows  in intervocalic position (e.g. 'medic',  'enclosed'). (E) /  (W) 'skew ray'), but final devoicing eliminates this from the surface:   ('ray').
There is dialectal variation in regards to affricate length, with long affricates occurring in both Eastern and Western dialects such as in Majorca and few areas in Southern Valencia. Also, intervocalic affricates are predominantly long, especially those that are voiced or occurring immediately after a stressed syllable (e.g.   (E) /  (W) 'medic'). In modern Valencian  and  have merged into .

Fricatives 
 occurs in Balearic, as well as in Alguerese, Standard Valencian and some areas in southern Catalonia. Everywhere else, it has merged with historic  so that  and  occur in complementary distribution.
'blue' f. vs.   'blue' m.).
In other varieties that have both sounds, they are in contrast before vowels, with neutralization in favor of  before consonants.

Sonorants 

'ground'),  is dark irrespective of position in Eastern dialects like Majorcan and standard Eastern Catalan (e.g.  ). 

The distribution of the two rhotics  and  closely parallels that of Spanish.
Between vowels, the two contrast (e.g.
Different dialects vary in regards to rhotics in the coda, with Western Catalan generally featuring  and Central Catalan dialects like those of Barcelona or Girona featuring a weakly trilled  unless it precedes a vowel-initial word in the same prosodic unit, in which case  appears (  in Western Catalan,  in Central Catalan).

In careful speech, and  may be geminated (e.g.   (E) /  (W) 'unnecessary';   (E) /  (W) 'to store';   'illusion'). A geminated  may also occur (e.g.   (E) /  (W) 'line'). Wheeler analyzes intervocalic  as the result of gemination of a single rhotic phoneme:   (E) /  (W) 'saw, mountains' (this is similar to the common analysis of Spanish and Portuguese rhotics).

Vowels 
{| class="wikitable" style="text-align: center;"
|+ Vowels of Catalan
!
! Front
! Central
! Back
|-
! Close 
| 
|
| 
|-
! Close-mid
| 
| rowspan="2" |
| 
|-
! Open-mid
| 
| 
|-
! Open
| colspan="3" | 
|} 

Phonetic notes:
 The vowel  is further back and open than the Castilian counterpart in North-Western and Central Catalan, slightly fronted and closed in Valencian and Ribagorçan , and further fronted and closed  in Majorcan.
 The close vowels  are more open than in Castilian. Unstressed  are centralized.
 In Valencian and most Balearic dialects  are further open and centralized.
'aim',   'leaves').
 Phonetic nasalization occurs for vowels occurring between nasal consonants or when preceding a syllable-final nasal; e.g.   (E) /  (W) ('Sunday').

Stressed vowels 

 

Most varieties of Catalan contrast seven stressed vowel phonemes. However, some Balearic dialects have an additional stressed vowel phoneme; e.g. ('dry, I sit'). Central Catalan   vs. Western Catalan   ('dry, I sit')). 

Contrasting series of the main Catalan dialects:
{| class="wikitable" style="text-align: center;"
|+ class="nowrap" | Central Catalan  [Eastern Catalan]
! 
! 
! Gloss
|-
| 
| 
| 'bag'
|-
| 
| 
| 'fold'
|-
| 
| 
| 'dry'/'I sit'
|-
| 
| 
| 'sic'
|-
| 
| 
| 'I am'
|-
| 
| 
| 'clog'
|-
| 
| 
| 'juice'
|-
! colspan="3" | Other contrast
|-
! 
! 
! Gloss
|-
| rowspan="2" | *set
| rowspan="2" | 
| 'seven'
|-
| 'thirst'
|}

Unstressed vowels 

However, in some Western dialects reduced vowels tend to merge into different realizations in some cases:
 Unstressed  may merge with  before a nasal or sibilant consonant (e.g.   'anvil',   'swarm'), in some environments before any consonant (e.g.   'earthy'), and in monosyllabic clitics. This sounds almost the same as the Barcelonian open schwa . Likewise, unstressed  may merge into  when in contact with palatal consonants (e.g.   'lord').
 Unstressed  may merge with  before a bilabial consonant (e.g.   'covered'), before a stressed syllable with a high vowel (e.g.   'rabbit'), in contact with palatal consonants (e.g.   'Joseph'), and in monosyllabic clitics. 

{| class="wikitable" style="text-align: center;"
|+ class="nowrap" | Central, Northern & General  Balearic [Eastern Catalan]
! Term
! 
! Gloss
|-
| 
| rowspan="2" | 
| 'speech'
|-
| 
| 'back'
|-
| 
| 
| 'lily'
|-
| 
| rowspan="2" | 
| 'iron'
|-
| 
| 'mutual'
|}

Diphthongs and triphthongs 

{| class="wikitable"
! colspan="6" | Falling diphthongs
|-
! IPA
! word
! gloss
! IPA
! word
! gloss
|-
|  ||  || 'water' ||  ||  || 'table'
|-
|  (E) (W) ||  || 'children' ||  (E) (W)  ||  || 'we will fall'
|-
|  ||  || 'remedy' ||  ||  || 'foot'
|-
|  ||  || 'king' ||  ||  || 'his/her'
|-
|  (E) (W) ||  || 'Ibiza' ||  (E) (W)  ||  || 'eufemism'
|-
| ||  ||  ||  ||  || 'nest'
|-
|  ||  || 'boy' ||  ||  || 'new'
|-
|  (E) (W) ||  || 'Moses' ||  ||  || 'well'
|-
|  ||  || 'today' ||  ||  || 's/he is carrying'
|-
! colspan="6" | Rising diphthongs
|-
! IPA
! word
! gloss
! IPA
! word
! gloss
|-
|  ||  || 'grandma' ||  ||  || 'glove'
|-
|  (E) (W) ||  || 's/he was doing' ||  (E) (W) ||  || 'watercolour painting'
|-
|  ||  || 'we see' ||  ||  || 'sequence'
|-
|  ||  || 'seat' ||  ||  || 'ointment'
|-
|  (E) (W) ||  || 'thank you' ||  (E) (W) || ,   || 'question', 'they say'
|-
| ||  ||  ||  ||  || 'penguin'
|-
|  ||  || 'iodine' ||  ||  || 'payment'
|-
|  (E) (W) ||  || 'yoghurt' ||  || seuós || 'greasy'
|-
|  ||  || 'Yugoslav' ||  ||  ||
|} 

  in word-initial position, e.g.  ('yoghurt').
 In the sequences  or  plus vowel, e.g.

Processes 
Diphthongization compensates for the loss of the palatal stop (segment loss compensation).

The dialectal distribution of compensatory diphthongization is almost entirely dependent on the dorsal stop and the extent of consonant assimilation (whether or not it is extended to palatals). 

Voiced affricates are devoiced after stressed vowels in dialects like Eastern Catalan where there may be a correlation between devoicing and lengthening (gemination) of voiced affricates:   →  ('medic'). In Barcelona, voiced stops may be fortified (geminated and devoiced); e.g.   'village').

Assimilations 
{| class="wikitable" style="text-align: center;"
|-
! colspan="3" | Nasal
! colspan="3" | Lateral
|-
! word
! IPA
! gloss
! word
! IPA
! gloss
|-
| ínfim ||  || 'lowest' || style="background:#fff solid 1px" colspan="3" |
|-
| anterior ||  (E) (W) || 'previous' || altes ||  (E) (W) || 'tall' (f. pl.)
|-
| engegar ||  (E) (W) || 'to start (up)' || àlgid ||  (E) (W) || 'decisive'
|-
| sang ||  (E) (W) || 'blood' || style="background:#fff solid 1px" colspan="3" |
|-
| sagna ||  (E) (W) || 'he bleeds' || style="background:#fff solid 1px" colspan="3" |
|-
| cotna ||  (E) (W) || 'rind' || atles ||  (E) (W) || 'atlas'
|-
| | sotmetent ||  (E) (W) || 'submitting' || ratllar ||  (E) (W) || 'to grate'
|} 

Catalan denti-alveolar stops can fully assimilate to the following consonant, producing gemination; this is particularly evident before nasal and lateral consonants: e.g. Learned words can alternate between featuring and not featuring such assimilation (e.g. 'atlas',   (E) /   (W) 'to administer'). 

Prosody

Stress 
Stress most often occurs on any of the last three syllables of a word (e.g.   (E) /  (W) 'compass',   'punishment',   (E) /  (W) 'fool'). 

Compound words and adverbs formed with  may have a syllable with secondary stress (e.g.   (E)  (W) 'willingly';   (E)  (W) 'lightning conductor') but every lexical word has just one syllable with main stress.

Phonotactics 
Clusters may consist of a consonant plus a semivowel (C, C) or an obstruent plus a liquid. Some speakers may have one of these obstruent-plus-liquid clusters preceding a semivowel, e.g. ('watermelon'); for other speakers, this is pronounced  (i.e. the semivowel must be syllabic in this context). 

Word-medial codas are restricted to one consonant +  (  (E) /  (W)). In the coda position, voice contrasts among obstruents are neutralized. Although there are exceptions (such as   'future'), syllable-final rhotics are often lost before a word boundary or before the plural morpheme of most words:   (E) /  (W) ('color') vs.   (E) /  (W) ('bright color'). 

In Central Eastern (and North-Western Catalan), obstruents fail to surface word-finally when preceded by a homorganic consonant (e.g. ). Complex codas simplify only if the loss of the segment doesn't result in the loss of place specification. 

{| class="wikitable"
|+Suffixation examples in Eastern Catalan
|-
!
! colspan="2" | Final
! gloss
! colspan="2" | Internal
! gloss
|-
! rowspan="6" | no cluster
| camp ||  || 'field' || camperol ||  || 'peasant'
|-
| punt ||  || 'point' || punta ||  || 'tip'
|-
| banc ||  || 'bank' || banca ||  || 'banking'
|-
| malalt ||  || 'ill' || malaltia ||  || 'illness'
|-
| hort ||  || 'orchard' || hortalissa ||  || 'vegetable'
|-
| gust ||  || 'taste' || gustar ||  || 'to taste'
|-
! rowspan="3" | cluster
| serp ||  || 'snake' || serpentí ||  || 'snake-like'
|-
| disc ||  || 'disk' || |disquet ||  || 'diskette'
|-
| remolc ||  || 'trailer' || remolcar ||  || 'to tow'
|}
The resulting generalization is that this underlying  will only surface in a morphologically complex word. Despite this, word-final codas are not usually simplified in most of Balearic and Valencian (e.g.  ). 

Word-initial clusters from Graeco-Latin learned words tend to drop the first phoneme:   (E) /  (W) ('pneumatic'),   (E) /  (W) ('pseudonym'),   (E) /  (W) ('pterodactylus'),   ('gnome'). 

Word-final obstruents are devoiced; however, they assimilate voicing of the following consonant, e.g.    (E) /  (W) ('silkworm'). In regular and fast speech, stops often assimilate the place of articulation of the following consonant producing phonetic gemination:   ('all good'). 

Word-final fricatives (except ) are voiced before a following vowel; e.g.   (E) /  (W) ('huge bus').

Dialectal variation 

The differences in the vocalic systems outlined above are the main criteria used to differentiate between the major dialects:
Western dialects, which allow any vowel in unstressed syllables, include Valencian and North-Western Catalan. 

Regarding consonants, betacism and fricative–affricate alternations are the most prominent differences between dialects. 

Other dialectal features are:
However, there are cases where regressive metaphony occurs over pretonic vowels; e.g.   →  ('towel'),   →  ('affects').
 In Southern Valencian subvarieties, especially in Alicante Valencian, the diphthong  (phonetically  in Valencian) has become :   ('bulls').
'it rains'.
('rooster'),   ('year').
 Varying degrees of L-velarization among dialects:  is dark irrespective of position in Balearic and Central Catalan and might tend to vocalization in some cases. In Western varieties like Valencian, this dark l contrasts with a clear l in intervocalic and word-initial position; while in other dialects, like Alguerese or Northern Catalan,  is never velarized in any instance.
('straw'). An exception to this rule is initial L-palatalization; e.g. ('moon').
 In northern and transitional Valencian, word-initial and postconsonantal  (Eastern Catalan  and ) alternates with  intervocalically; e.g.   'game', but   'worse',   'crazy' (standard Valencian , ; ; standard Catalan ,  and ).
 In northern Valencia and southern Catalonia  has merged with realizations of  after a high front vocoid; e.g.   ('pottery'),   ('I insist') vs.   ('to pee'),   ('to leave'). In these varieties  is not found after other voiced consonants, and merges with  after consonants; e.g.   ('thorn').
 Intervocalic  dropping (particularly participles) in regular speech in Valencian, with compensatory lengthening of vowel ; e.g.   ('evening').
 In northern Catalonia and in the town of Sóller (Majorca), a uvular trill  or approximant  can be heard instead of an alveolar trill; e.g.   ('to run').
In some Valencian dialects final  can be lenited before a vowel:   ('all this').
In some dialects (e.g. many Valencian accents) initial  can be lenited:   (EC)  (WC).
In Majorcan varieties,  and  become  and  word-finally and before front vowels, in some of these dialects, this has extended to all environments except before liquids and back vowels; e.g.   ('blood').
In Majorcan and Minorcan Catalan,  undergoes total assimilation to a following consonant (just as stops do):   ('large puff').
In some Valencian dialects (e.g.

Historical development 

Catalan shares features with neighboring Romance languages (Occitan, Italian, Sardinian, French, Spanish). 

 Lenition of voiced stops  as in Galician and Spanish.
 Abundance of diphthongs containing , as in Galician and Portuguese.

In contrast with other Romance languages, Catalan has many monosyllabic words; and those ending in a wide variety of consonants and some consonant clusters. Also, Catalan has final obstruent devoicing, thus featuring many couplets like  ('male friend') vs.  ('female friend').

Phonological sample 
{| class="wikitable"
|+ Universal Declaration of Human Rights, Article 1
|-
! Original
| 
|-
! Old Catalan (Around the 13th century) IPA
| 
|-
! Balearic Catalan IPA 
| 
|-
! Eastern Central Catalan IPA
| 
|-
! Northern Catalan IPA
| 
|-
! North-Western Catalan IPA
| 
|-
! Valencian IPA
| 
|}

See also 
 Catalan dialects
 Alguerese dialect#Phonology
 Index of phonetics articles
 Occitan phonology

References

Bibliography

Further reading

External links 
 A proposal for Catalan SAMPA
 Gramàtica de la llengua catalana 
 Els sons del català 
 L'estàndard oral valencià  

Phonology, Catalan
Italic phonologies